The Whale Rider is a 1987 novel by New Zealand author Witi Ihimaera. In 2002 it was adapted into a film, Whale Rider, directed by Niki Caro.

Plot

Set in the 1980s in Whangara, a Māori community on the eastern edge of New Zealand's North Island, the novel is a retelling of the myth of Paikea.

Kahu is the eldest great-grandchild of chieftain Koro Apirana; had she been a boy, she would have been the natural future leader of the tribe. She is attuned to the traditional Māori way of life, and may have inherited the ability to speak to whales. The novel is narrated by Kahu's uncle, Rawiri, who travels to Australia and Papua New Guinea where the narrative focuses on the shaping of his own understanding of his Māori identity.

Reception

The Whale Rider has been a worldwide bestseller, and is the most-translated work by a New Zealand author. In 1995 it was translated into Māori by Tīmoti Kāretu, as Te kaieke tohorā. In 2006 a picture book version illustrated by Bruce Potter was listed as one of the Storylines Children's Literature Foundation of New Zealand Notable Books List.

On the World Socialist Web Site, John Braddock criticised The Whale Rider for its reactionary focus on identity politics, noting that "Whale Rider presents Maori as “one people”. There is no attempt to concretely examine, from a critical perspective, the social system and class oppression that determine the daily realities of ordinary Maori. Their future is conceived in an entirely utopian manner—as the rediscovery of tribal roots and assertion of cultural traditions and “spirituality”—separated entirely from that of the working class." and that The Whale Rider is emblematic of "An emerging middle-class layer of tribal leaders and youth, radicalised in the late 1960’s, [who] intervened to abort the development of a unified class consciousness within the working class as a whole. Encouraged by the Labour Party and union bureaucracy, they turned Maori workers instead towards the struggle for “indigenous rights”—in particular land rights—and the rediscovery of tribal identity."

In 2022, The Whale Rider was included on the Big Jubilee Read, a list of 70 books by Commonwealth authors produced to celebrate Queen Elizabeth II's Platinum Jubilee.

References

1987 novels
Novels set in New Zealand
Works about Māori people
Fiction about whales